Scaglione may refer to;

Antonio Scaglione, 16th-century Italian architect
Franco Scaglione, Italian automotive designer
Josefina Scaglione, Argentinian musical theatre actress
Massimo Scaglione (1931–2015), Italian television director, writer and politician
Pietro Scaglione, Chief Prosecutor of Palermo, Sicily; murdered by Mafia, 1971
Tony Scaglione, drummer for thrash metal/speed metal band Whiplash